Chelsea Randall (born 14 June 1991) is an Australian rules footballer playing for the Adelaide Football Club in the AFL Women's competition. She is one of the club's inaugural AFLW team co-captains.

Early life and state league football
Randall began playing football in the boys under-11 side at the Safety Bay Stingers.

She is a two-time winner of the WAWFL best and fairest award.

Randall is a three-time All-Australian and has represented Western Australia at four national championships. Her first selection came at the age of 15. In 2013, she captained the state's side at that year's championships.

In 2011, she was selected as one of eight players to participate the AIS/AFL women's academy.

Randall was drafted to the  side for the 2013 women's AFL exhibition series with the third overall pick. In 2014, she was returned to Melbourne's side and was named best on ground in the series' second exhibition match of that year. She recorded fourteen marks and two goals in the match. Randall continued to play for the side through to the end of the 2016 exhibition series.

AFL Women's career

She was named the club's inaugural AFL Women's captain in January 2017. Randall was nominated by her teammates for the AFLW Players’ Most Valuable Player Award, and was listed in the All-Australian team.

Randall won the 2017 AFLW Players' Most Courageous Award.

On 18 May 2017, Adelaide signed Randall for the 2018 AFLW season.

Randall had another successful season in 2018, and was named the Crows' club champion, receiving 162 of a possible 168 votes over the season and scoring a maximum 24 votes in four of seven matches. She also won the AFLW Players' Most Courageous Award again, and was named captain of the 2018 AFL Women's All-Australian team. Randall again co-captained the side in the 2019 season, where she had another superb year, winning a second premiership and also being named for the third year running in the AFLW All-Australian team.

She suffered a serious injury to her knee at the start of the 2020 pre-season, ruling her out of the entire 2020 AFLW season. After her co-captain Erin Phillips relinquished her share of the captaincy, Randall was appointed sole captain of the Crows ahead of the 2021 season.

Statistics
 Statistics are correct to the end of the 2022 Season.

|- style="background:#EAEAEA"
| scope="row" text-align:center | 2017
|
| 26 || 8 || 2 || 2 || 85 || 28 || 113 || 24 || 39 || 0.3 || 0.3 || 10.6 || 3.5 || 14.1 || 3.0 || 4.9 || 4
|-
| scope="row" text-align:center | 2018
|
| 26 || 7 || 1 || 0 || 85 || 29 || 114 || 22 || 34 || 0.1 || 0.0 || 12.1 || 4.1 || 16.3 || 3.1 || 4.9 || 6
|- style="background:#EAEAEA"
| scope="row" text-align:center | 2019
|
| 26 || 8 || 1 || 1 || 72 || 51 || 123 || 28 || 17 || 0.1 || 0.1 || 9.0 || 6.4 || 15.4 || 3.5 || 2.1 || 4
|-
| scope="row" text-align:center | 2020
|
| 26 || 0 || – || – || – || – || – || – || – || – || – || – || – || – || – || – || 0
|- style="background:#EAEAEA"
| scope="row" text-align:center | 2021
|
| 26 || 9 || 6 || 2 || 68 || 43 || 111 || 25 || 22 || 0.7 || 0.2 || 7.6 || 4.8 || 12.3 || 2.8 || 2.4 || 3
|- style="background:#EAEAEA"
| scope="row" text-align:center | 2022
|
| 26 || 6 || 0 || 0 || 43 || 10 || 53 || 16 || 8 || 0 || 0 || 7.2 || 1.7 || 8.8 || 2.7 || 1.3 || 
|- class="sortbottom"
! colspan=3| Career
! 38
! 10
! 5
! 354
! 161
! 515
! 116
! 121
! 0.3
! 0.1
! 9.3
! 4.2
! 13.6
! 3.1
! 3.2
! 17
|}

Personal life
Off the field, Randall works at the Adelaide Football Club as a community programs officer. In addition to her work, Randall is studying to become a physical education teacher.

In 2015 and 2016, Randall lived and worked in the remote mining town of Newman in the Pilbara region of Western Australia. She regularly completed a thirteen-hour drive in order to play for Swan Districts in the WAWFL.

In 2020, Randall competed on The Amazing Race Australia 5 with Marijana Rajčić as a "stowaway team". In post-show interviews, the two revealed that they had started dating before filming began.

References

External links 

Living people
1991 births
Adelaide Football Club (AFLW) players
Australian rules footballers from Western Australia
All-Australians (AFL Women's)
The Amazing Race contestants
Lesbian sportswomen
Australian LGBT sportspeople
LGBT players of Australian rules football